A Heavy Freezing Spray Watch is issued by the National Weather Service of the United States when there is an increased risk of a heavy spray event that meets the necessary criteria, but the occurrence, timing, and/or location are still uncertain, though the area where it may happen is predicted.  A watch will be issued when forecasters expect freezing water droplets to be able to start icing and accumulate on sea vessels or near-sea vehicles at rates of 2 cm per hour or greater.  This accumulation must be caused by an "appropriate combination of cold water, wind, sub-freezing air temperature, and vessel movement."

See also
 Severe weather terminology (United States)

References

External links
 National Weather Service

Weather warnings and advisories

Example:

GALE WARNING REMAINS IN EFFECT FROM 1 AM SATURDAY TO 7 AM EST
SUNDAY...
...HEAVY FREEZING SPRAY WATCH IN EFFECT FROM SATURDAY AFTERNOON
THROUGH SUNDAY EVENING...

The National Weather Service in Northern Indiana has issued a
Heavy Freezing Spray Watch, which is in effect from Saturday
afternoon through Sunday evening.

 WINDS...South 20 to 30 knots with gusts to 35-knot gales early
  Saturday. Winds veer west to 30 knots by midday Saturday with
  gusts up to 40-knot gales continuing through early Sunday
  morning.

 WAVES...Waves build to 8 to 14 feet occasionally 18 feet on
  Saturday and persist into Sunday morning.

 FREEZING SPRAY...Ice may rapidly accumulate on decks and
  superstructures which could result in a loss of vessel
  stability.

PRECAUTIONARY/PREPAREDNESS ACTIONS...

A Gale Warning means winds of 34 to 47 knots are imminent or
occurring. Operating a vessel in gale conditions requires
experience and properly equipped vessels. It is highly
recommended that mariners without the proper experience seek safe
harbor prior to the onset of gale conditions.

A Heavy Freezing Spray Watch is issued when the risk of heavy
freezing spray has significantly increased...but the specific
timing and/or location is still uncertain.  It is intended to
provide additional lead time for mariners who may wish to
consider altering their plans.